Dr. Brain is a 2021 South Korean web series created by Kim Jee-woon. The sci-fi thriller is based on the Korean webtoon of the same name by Hongjacga. Lee Sun-kyun stars in the lead role as a brain scientist trying to solve the mysterious death of his family by hacking into the brains of the deceased. The series is the first Korean-language show produced for Apple TV+. It debuted on November 4, 2021 to accompany the streaming service's launch in South Korea.

On January 27, 2022, multiple official sources stated that the series would have a second season.

Premise 
After losing his family in a mysterious accident, Sewon, a brilliant brain scientist, tries to solve what happened.  He performs "brain syncs" with the deceased in order to search for clues hidden in their memories, but it becomes difficult to separate those memories from his own experiences.

Cast 
 Lee Sun-kyun as Sewon Koh, the brain scientist
 Lee Yoo-young as Jaeyi Jung, Sewon's wife
 Park Hee-soon as Kangmu Lee, a private investigator
 Seo Ji-hye as Jiun Choi, a lieutenant of an investigative unit
  as Namil Hong, Sewon's colleague
 Uhm Tae-goo
 Joo Min-kyung as Doctor

Episodes

Season 1 (2021)

Production and release 
Director Kim Jee-woon had reportedly tried to adapt the Daum webtoon Dr. Brain, but it never went into production.  In May 2019, however, he was able to go into series production with YG Studioplex. For a time, the project was developed under the working title Mr. Robin, and Lee Sun-kyun was offered the lead role in October 2020. Lee had signed on by March 2021 when Apple picked up the series as it was entering production, making it the first Korean-language series for its streaming service. In October 2021, Apple set a release date of November 4, 2021 to coincide with the launch of Apple TV+ in South Korea. Along with the release date, the rest of the main cast was revealed.  The series consists of six episodes to be released on a weekly basis from the series debut through December 9, 2021.

On January 27, 2022, multiple official sources stated that the series would have a second season.

Reception 
The review aggregator website Rotten Tomatoes reported an 80% approval rating with an average rating of 7.7/10, based on 15 critic reviews. The website's critics consensus reads, "Working its way through a heady premise perhaps a little too ponderously, Dr. Brain nevertheless gives viewers plenty of cerebral thrills to mull over." Metacritic, which uses a weighted average, gave a score of 71 out of 100 based on 11 critics, indicating "generally favorable reviews".

References

External links 
 
 
 
 
 Dr. Brain at Tapas Comics

Webtoons
Tapastic webcomics
2020s mystery television series
2020s science fiction television series
2021 South Korean television series debuts
Apple TV+ original programming
Korean-language television shows
South Korean mystery television series
South Korean science fiction television series
South Korean thriller television series
South Korean drama web series
Television series by YG Entertainment
Television shows based on South Korean webtoons